The 2020–21 PSA Men's World Squash Championship was the 2020–21 men's edition of the World Squash Championships, which served as the individual world championship for squash players. The event took place in Chicago, United States from 14 to 22 July 2021. It was the second time that Chicago hosted the PSA World Championships after 2018–19 edition.

World Ranking Points/Prize money
PSA also awards points towards World Ranking. Points are awarded as follows:

Prize money breakdown
Total prize money for the tournament is $1,000,000, $500,000 per gender. This is a 7,65% prize fund increase from previous World Championships (2019–20, $335,000 Men's/$430,000 Women's) that were held separately.

Seeds

  Ali Farag (champion)
  Mohamed El Shorbagy (runner-up)
  Tarek Momen (semifinals)
  Paul Coll (semifinals)
  Marwan El Shorbagy (quarterfinals)
  Karim Abdel Gawad (quarterfinals)
  Fares Dessouky (quarterfinals)
  Diego Elías (quarterfinals)

  Joel Makin (third round)
  Miguel Ángel Rodríguez (third round)
  Mohamed Abouelghar (third round)
  Saurav Ghosal (third round)
  Grégoire Marche (third round)
  Mazen Hesham (second round)
  Omar Mosaad (second round)
  James Willstrop (first round)

Draw and results

Key
 r = Retired

Finals

Top half

Section 1

Section 2

Bottom half

Section 3

Section 4

Schedule
Times are Central Daylight Time (UTC−05:00). To the best of five games.

Round 1

——————————————————————————————————————————————————————————————————————————————————————————————————————————

Round 2

Round 3

Quarter-finals

Semi-finals

Final

Representation
This table shows the number of players by country in the 2020–21 PSA Men's World Championship. A total of 19 nationalities are represented. Egypt is the most numerous nation with 14 players.

See also
 World Squash Championships
 2020–21 PSA Women's World Squash Championship

References

World Squash Championships
Men's World Squash Championship
Squash tournaments in the United States
International sports competitions hosted by the United States
PSA Men's World Squash Championship
PSA
PSA